Baahubali 2: The Conclusion is a 2017 Indian epic action film directed by S. S. Rajamouli, who co-wrote the film with V. Vijayendra Prasad. It was produced by Shobu Yarlagadda and Prasad Devineni under the banner Arka Media Works. The film was produced in Tollywood, the centre of Telugu language films in India, and was filmed in both Telugu and Tamil languages simultaneously. It features Prabhas, Rana Daggubati, Anushka Shetty, Tamannaah, Ramya Krishna, Sathyaraj, Nassar, and Subbaraju. The second cinematic part in the Baahubali franchise, it is the follow-up to Baahubali: The Beginning, serving as both a sequel and a prequel. The film is set in medieval India and follows the sibling rivalry between Amarendra Baahubali and Bhallaladeva; the latter conspires against the former and has him killed by Kattappa. Years later, Amarendra's son returns to avenge his death.

The production was launched on 17 December 2015 at Ramoji Film City, Hyderabad. The cinematography was done by K. K. Senthil Kumar, and was edited by Kotagiri Venkateswara Rao. The production design was done by Sabu Cyril, while the action sequences were choreographed by Peter Hein. The visual effects were designed by R. C. Kamalakannan, with assistance from Adel Adili and Pete Draper. The soundtrack and the background music were composed by M. M. Keeravani. Baahubali 2 was released on 28 April 2017 in Telugu, Tamil, Hindi, Malayalam version and later dubbed in Japanese, Russian and Chinese. Released in conventional 2D and IMAX formats, Baahubali 2 was the first Telugu film to also release in 4K High Definition format.

Grossing  worldwide ($280.7 million), the film surpassed PK (2014) to briefly become the highest grossing Indian film of all time, collecting approximately  worldwide within just six days of its release. Within India, it set many film records, becoming the highest-grossing film in Hindi, as well as in its original Telugu and Tamil languages. It stands as the highest grossing film in India, and the second highest-grossing Indian film worldwide. The film sold over 10 crore (100million) tickets during its box office run, the highest estimated admissions for any film in India since Sholay (1975).

Baahubali 2, like its predecessor, received nationwide and universal acclaim for Rajamouli's direction, the story, cinematography, themes, visual effects, music, action sequences, acting, and emotional weight. It was also praised by the actors of the film industry alike and, along with its predecessor and Rajamouli's other films, is widely regarded as one greatest Indian epic action films. It won the Saturn Award for Best International Film and three National Film Awards: Best Popular Film Providing Wholesome Entertainment, Best Special Effects and Best Stunt Choreographer.

Plot 

Kattappa continues to narrate how he was under compulsion to assassinate Amarendra Bahubali. After vanquishing the Kalakeyas, Amarendra is declared as the heir apparent to the throne while Bhallaladeva is announced as the kingdom's future commander-in-chief. Rajmata Sivagami Devi sends Amarendra on a tour under disguise with Kattappa for attaining knowledge in political affairs. During the tour, Amarendra witnesses the valour of Kuntala's Princess Devasena / Thevasenai when she resists a group of attackers. Falling in love with her, he approaches her after the fight, posing as a simpleton and Kattappa plays along with him as his uncle. Amarendra is accepted as guard at the royal palace of Kuntala while Bhallaladeva perceives about Amarendra's acts and upon viewing Devasena's portrait, lusts for her and acquires a promise from Shivagami, who assures Bhallaladeva's marriage with Devasena oblivious to the fact that Amarendra has already fallen in love with her. Shivagami sends an emissary to Kuntala proposing marriage but the emissary portrays it in a patronizing way leaving Devasena enraged. She gives a scathing reply rejecting the proposal and upon receiving her response, Shivagami sends an order to Amarendra that Devasena be brought to Mahishmati as a captive.

In Kuntala, an attack by Pindari dacoits on the royal palace exposes Amarendra and Kattappa's bravery and they nullify the attack with assistance from Devasena's maternal cousin Kumara Varma who overcomes his cowardice. Upon being confronted when Amarendra receives a message to capture Devasena, Kattappa reveals that Amarendra is the future king of Mahishmati. Amarendra, promising Devasena that he would protect her honour at any cost takes her to Mahishmati. In the court, the misunderstanding is brought to light and Shivagami asks Amarendra to choose between the throne and Devasena. Unwilling to break his promise to the princess, he chooses to marry her and serve the kingdom as its commander-in-chief. Bhallaladeva's coronation takes place at a grand note but he seethes with jealousy over his popularity among citizens. Devasena expects a child and during her baby shower, Bhallaladeva deprives Amarendra of his commander post under pretext of making sure that Amarendra spends most of his time with his pregnant wife and the post is offered to Sethupathi. Devasena questions the decision, declaring it unfair and confronts Shivagami for her inactions. She asks Amarendra to ascend the throne as a gift to her that leaves everyone stunned.

Devasena, during her visit to a temple cuts Sethupathi's fingers off with a dagger when he dares to misbehave with visiting women and her. She is shackled and produced in the court where Amarendra beheads Sethupathi for his misdeeds and as a result, both Devasena and Amarendra are banished from royal palace and are supposed to live as commoners. As Amarendra's fame does not decrease, Bijjaladeva and Bhallaladeva stage a conspiracy to further turn Shivagami against Amarendra. Bijjaladeva convinces Kumara Varma that Amarendra, Devasena and their unborn baby's lives shall be threatened by Bhallaladeva's machinations and manipulates him into entering the palace at stealth of night for assassinating Bhallaladeva to do good. However, Kumara Varma and his companions are defeated and killed before which Kumara Varma learns that it is a conspiracy to have Shivagami pass an order to assassinate Amarendra. Shivagami, who believes that Kumara Varma is sent by Amarendra for murdering Bhallaladeva secretly passes an order to Kattappa for assassinating Amarendra as declaring it publicly would lead to an internal war.

Destined to be bound to the kingdom, Kattappa helplessly lures Amarendra into a secluded place feigning that he is in trouble where Amarendra is backstabbed and killed. Kattappa is made aware of Bhallaladeva's treachery and exposes it to Shivagami, who regrets while Devasena delivers a male child. Shivagami declares to the panicked hordes outside the palace that Amarendra died and his son Mahendra Baahubali would ascend the throne. She orders an assembly to punish Bhallaladeva and his father but as Bhallaladeva and his men are about to seize Shivagami, she flees with the new King but falls into a river after being hit by an arrow shot by Bhallaladeva which leads her to a passage that ends down the mountain. Bhallaladeva becomes a tyrannical emperor who holds Devasena prisoner for the next 25 years and destroys Kuntala, Mahendra ends up in alliance with the rebels who try to rescue her. After listening to the whole story, Mahendra Baahubali (alias Shivudu / Shiva) immediately declares war. He assembles the rebel army, consisting of villagers and scattered soldiers.

With Kattappa's and Avantika's assistance, the army lays siege to Mahishmati. Bhallaladeva recaptures Devasena, but Kattappa, Mahendra, and the rebels breach the city walls and save her. Mahendra fights his uncle and pins him down using the chains from Devasena's cage. After completing a cleansing ritual, Devasena burns Bhallaladeva on a pyre, ending his reign permanently. The next day, Mahendra is crowned as the new king of Mahishmati with Avantika as his queen. He declares Mahishmati will be dedicated to upholding peace and justice under his leadership. He also orders his men to toss the head of Bhallaladeva's statue out of the palace walls, where it is swept to the great waterfall. It breaks as it falls and crashes against the cliff's walls and lands near the lingam that Mahendra carried earlier.

Cast

Credited 
The following is the credited cast:
 Prabhas in a dual role as
 Amarendra Baahubali, the adoptive heir to the throne of Mahishmati (Telugu) / Magizhmathi (Tamil) and a respected prince by the people for his compassion and nobility.
 Mahendra Baahubali  "Sivudu" (Telugu) / "Sivu" (Tamil) (son), Amarendra's son to Devasena who was born during his father's death and grows up to meet the rebel alliance that is combating Bhallaladeva.
 Rana Daggubati as Bhallaladeva (Telugu) / Palvaalthevan (Tamil), Amarendra's biological cousin and adoptive older brother who was extremely jealous of his popularity, and has plotted to erase his right to the throne since childhood. Unlike Baahubali he cares little for his people and is shown to enslave his subjects, and he frames his own assassination to get Kattappa to kill Baahubali.
 Anushka Shetty as Devasena (Telugu) / Devasenai (Tamil), the younger sister of the king of Kuntala, who marries Baahubali. Her inclusion in the royal family and calling out Sivagami's and Palvaalthevan's/ Bhallaladeva's law leads to civil conflict in the kingdom and their exile
 Tamannaah as Avanthika, a young and powerful rebel warrior whom Mahendra falls in love with. She helps him take the kingdom back and they get married.
 Ramya Krishna as Sivagami Devi, Bhallaladeva's / Palvaalthevan's mother and Bijaladeva's / Pingalathevan's wife, and a former subject of the kingdom who rises to become queen. She has one of the highest authorities in the kingdom and is a skilled combatant. She is nearly murdered by her own son as she tries to smuggle Mahendra out of the kingdom.
 Nassar as Bijjaladeva (Telugu) / Pingalathevan  (Tamil), the deranged father of Bhallaladeva / Palvaalthevan and husband of Sivagami, he has a broken hand from battle and just like his son he believes in exploiting his subjects and being oppressive. Because of this he was never formally granted control of the kingdom. His brother Vikramadeva is the biological father of Amarendra Baahubali.
 Sathyaraj as Kattappa, a sibling figure to Sivagami and is called an uncle to Bhallaladeva and Amarendra. He's a member of a lineage of incredibly skilled warriors who serve the royal family like servants, but he also authorizes the kingdom's military.
 Subbaraju as Kumara Varma, a relative of Devasena who is competitive against her and is a cowardly warrior, but is motivated by Amarendra to stand up to the Pindari invasion on Kuntala. He is killed by Bijaladeva / Pingalathevan in an elaborate trap to frame Baahubali for treason.

Others 
 Rakesh Varre as Sethupathi, a friend of Bhallaladeva who takes the role of army commander after Baahubali is resigned, he is  beheaded by Baahubali when he finds out that Sethupati touched his wife vulgarly.
 Meka Ramakrishna as Jaya Varma, Devasena's brother and the former king of Kuntala. He's killed by Bhallaladeva during the final battle.
 Charandeep Surneni as Inkoshi's brother, who takes role of the chief of the Kalakeyas. He is killed by Baahubali.
 Rohini as Sanga, Mahendra's adoptive mother.
 Prudhvi Raj as the Prime Minister of Kunthala kingdom
 Madhusudhan Rao as the messenger from Mahishmathi Kingdom
 Shatru as the leader of the Pindari tribe, which is a tribe of plunderers and raiders. They lay siege to Kuntala and Amarendra kills the leader and drowns the rest of the army.
 Ajay Ghosh as a dacoit

Production 

Baahubali: The Conclusion was produced by Tollywood, the centre of Telugu-language films in India based out of Hyderabad. However, it was filmed in both the Telugu and Tamil languages simultaneously. The film series is touted to be the most expensive in India as of this date. Rajamouli's father V. Vijayendra Prasad who wrote stories for most of his films once again gave the story for Baahubali. The series was produced by Shobu Yarlagadda and Prasad Devineni. R.C.Kamalakannan was chosen as visual effects supervisor and Kotagiri Venkateswara Rao was the editor. PM Satheesh was the sound designer and stunt sequences were coordinated by King Solomon, Lee Whittaker, and Kecha. The film's costume designers are Rama Rajamouli and Prasanthi Tripuraneni. The line producer was M.M Srivalli. The film shooting started on 17 December 2015 at Ramoji Film City in Hyderabad with Prabhas and Ramya Krishna. The film featuring Telugu actors Prabhas and Rana Daggubati in the lead roles became the biggest ever movie in India in terms of scale of production and making . The film is also known by the abbreviation BB2. Sabu Cyril was the production designer and Peter Hein was the choreographer. R. C. Kamalakannan was the VFX supervisor and was assisted by Pete Draper and Adel Adili, co-founder of Makuta VFX.

Casting 
Prabhas was cast as main lead of the film. Anushka Shetty was cast as the lead actress of the film as she was also a part of Mirchi (2013). She coincidentally became the first heroine Rajamouli repeated in his films and thus made her schedules full for 2013 and 2014. Rana Daggubati was cast as the antagonist of the film and coincidentally he was also a part of Rudhramadevi. Sathyaraj signed the film.

In April 2013, Adivi Sesh was cast for a crucial role in the film as Rajamouli was impressed by his work in Panjaa (2011). Actress Ramya Krishna was chosen to play the crucial role in the film as "Rajamatha" in August 2013. Actor Nassar was selected to play a supporting role. Charandeep was selected to play the brother of the film's chief villain. On 20 December 2013 a press release stated that Tamannaah will be starring in the film playing the role of "Avanthika". Meka Ramakrishna was picked for the head of the Kuntala guerillas.

Characters and looks 
Rana Daggubati was said to be playing the role of Prabhas' brother and he too underwent a lot of physical transformation satisfying the role he was assigned to play in the film. He also underwent training in Martial arts under the supervision of a Vietnamese trainer, Tuan. Sathyaraj has a Tonsured look for his role in the film. Sudeep said that he would play the role of a weapons trader Aslam Khan in this film. In the end of October 2013, Rana appeared at a fashion show with a beefed up body which, according to him, was a part of his look in the film. In mid-May 2014, reports emerged that Anushka would play a pregnant woman for a few sequences in the second part of the film.

At the same time, Prabhas posted on his Facebook page that he underwent minor shoulder surgery and would join the film's sets in a span of a month.  On 1 June 2014, Prabhas and Rana's trainer Lakshman Reddy, said that Prabhas started his training 8 months before the commencement of shooting and after two years, both of them weighed nearly 100 kilos each. He also added that Prabhas has two attires with a heavy, bulky body for Baahubali's role and a lean physique for the second role. For his look, Prabhas met WWE superstars like The Undertaker in February 2014 and interacted with them about their daily regimen and workouts.

Prabhas had equipment costing 15 million shipped to his home, where he built a personal gym. His breakfast included 40 half-boiled egg whites blended and added with protein powder. In mid-June 2014, regarding her role in the film, Tamannaah said that she would be playing the role of a warrior princess named Avanthika and her appearance in the film is completely different when compared to her past films. Before joining the film's shoot, Tamannaah did costume trials for the film which she confirmed in her micro-blogging page stating "I am very excited to get on to the set of Baahubali. I did some dress trials today and my look in this movie will be totally new. I have never been seen in such sort of a look till now. It will be a new role for me." Rajamouli called Tamannaah and her characterisation as a "value addition" to the movie. She stated that she plays Avanthika, and had a special training and diet regime. The film introduced a new language called Kiliki.

Piracy 
On 22 November 2016, a 2-minute war sequence from the film was leaked and posted on Facebook and Twitter. The following day, the police arrested a video editor for stealing and uploading the scenes. The Deccan Chronicle, noticing the lack of punishment, felt the leak was a publicity stunt. Following this, a 9-minute war sequence supposedly from the climax was leaked. The video lacked VFX.

Themes 

Director S. S. Rajamouli revealed that Baahubali is inspired by the epic Mahabharata. V. Vijayendra Prasad, the screenwriter and Rajamouli's father who wrote stories for most of Rajamouli's films, once again penned the story for Baahubali. Vijayendra Prasad revealed that Sivagami has shades of both Kunti and Kaikeyi while Devasena is a warrior like Sita. He further added that he sees Baahubali as the story of Sivagami and Devasena. He was also inspired by tales of Chandamama and Amar Chitra Katha comics.
In March 2017, Rajamouli said in an interview that "Why Kattappa killed Baahubali" is the theme of the film. The tagline "The boy he raised, the man he killed" was billed in a poster featuring Kattappa. Rajamouli had stated that the Mahabharata was a source of inspiration for the film. According to K.K. Senthil Kumar, the colour palette used was based on the "mood and feel." He contrasts different tones used within the film: warm colours for Mahishmati, cool colours for Kuntala, desaturated colours for the frame in which Baahubali is expelled.

Kanniks Kannikeswaran writes the characters resemble those "from Chandamama issues from the 1960s and 70s" and feels that the "plots and subplots that bear distinct similarities to themes from the Ramayana and the Mahabharata." He calls Amarendra the "perfect Rama," while calling Bhallaladeva "Duryodana incarnate, an atatayi." Bijjaladeva is compared to Shakuni, while the death of Bhadrudu is compared to Jayadratha's death in the Mahabharata. Kannikeswaran also feels that the film has visual parallels with The Lion King, while also noting the similarities with Mulan. Writing about the similarities with the latter, he states, "Mulan pins a villain to a roof where he is reduced to ashes right in the midst of a firework display. The evil Bhallala is pinned with a sword to the 'chita' pyre that consumes him in the final frames of the film." He calls the film "Shivocentric," noting the appearance of a Shivatandava stotra and that Shiva is the tutelage deity of Mahishmati. The main character is healed by Shiva in the end of the film, while noting Ganesha also makes an appearance in a fire ritual.

According to Chandan Gowda, a professor at the Azim Premji University, "the social order [in the film] appears to be a varna order: Brahmins, Kshatriyas and Vaishyas are named with the Shudras staying an unnamed presence," also noting that "Muslims are also part of the Mahishmati kingdom." Mahesh Kathi felt that the modules and imagery were borrowed from Indian epics like Mahabharata and called Prabhas' character "a mix of the Pandavas put together," while Gowda writes that the influence is "at best rough," stating that the film cannot match the "moral depth or complexity" of Mahabharata. He further contrasts the themes of both, writing, "the heroes have failings and the villains redeeming virtues, making us morally ambivalent towards them both,
Baahubali goes for black and white: its heroes are wholly good and the villains pure evil." According to Gowda, the palace scenes resemble those in Ben Hur (1959) and Troy (2004) while the fight sequences are similar to the Chinese films Crouching Tiger, Hidden Dragon (2000).

Critics noticed similarities between Baahubali 2 and The Lion King, an adaptation of William Shakespeare's Hamlet (1599–1602). This similarity was also felt by fans, who created memes of the comparison.  The Indian Express makes a comparison, stating that both films are a tale of two brothers, where inhabitants suffer under a cruel ruler, who is the brother of a kind ruler. The son of the kind ruler grows in remote lands, unaware of his lineage, guided to his home by his love interest. The spouse of the kind ruler is treated badly by the cruel ruler. The son also has an advisor, who helps him realize his identity. They further note that the kind ruler and his son look similar in both films. Firstpost notes that both Bhallaladeva and Scar share a scar on one eye, and both Simba and Mahendra are introduced similarly into the world.

Music 

Rajamouli's cousin M. M. Keeravani composed the music and background for the film. The Conclusion
Telugu soundtrack was released on 26 March 2017 at the pre-release event of the film at YMCA grounds. The album of the film's Hindi version was released on 5 April 2017, while the Tamil version was released on 9 April. The Malayalam version was released on 24 April 2017.

Release 
Initially scheduled for release in Summer 2016, the release date  of Baahubali 2 was postponed to November 2016 due to preparations for the international release of The Beginning in various locations. This was further pushed to 28 April 2017.
At first, the joint budget of both The Beginning and The Conclusion was speculated to be around 2.5 billion. This was later confirmed by Rajamouli in 2015. However, the joint budget of the series was increased to 4.3 billion, of which 1.8 billion was the budget for The Beginning and 2.5 billion for The Conclusion. The climax of The Conclusion alone cost 300 million, almost double the amount of The Beginning climax.

Screenings and statistics 

An initial limited release of Baahubali 2 took place in most Gulf countries, including the UAE, on 27 April 2017. In India, the film was released on 28 April.
The film was screened at the British Film Institute. It was also premiered at the 39th Moscow International Film Festival. The film was also showcased at the 49th International Film Festival of India in the "Indian Panorama" section.
According to Umair Sandhu, a member of the UAE censor board, Baahubali 2 received a standing ovation from the board during its review. On 22 April, the Telugu version of Baahubali 2 was reviewed by the Indian Censor Board and given an U/A rating with minor cuts. The Japanese Censor Board gave a rating of G with no cuts. The Central Board of Film Censors, Pakistan, cleared the film with an "all clear" status and zero cuts. In Singapore, the film received an 'A' (adult) certificate, which an Indiatimes report attributes to the portrayal of violent scenes.

Baahubali 2 was released across more than 9,000 plus screens worldwide- 6500 screens in India alone, breaking the record for the widest Indian film release. It released in conventional 2D as well as in IMAX format. This made Baahubali 2 the third Indian film to release in IMAX, following Dhoom 3 and Bang Bang!. It was released in Telugu and Tamil along with dubbed versions in Hindi and Malayalam. In Kerala, the film was released across 395 screens. The film was released in 1,100 screens in the United States, and 150 screens in Canada. The Hindi version was released in New Zealand, Australia and Fiji Islands, while the Tamil version was released in Malaysia. In Pakistan, the Hindi version was released in over 100 screens. The first Telugu film to be released in 4K High Definition format, close to 200 screens were upgraded to 4K projectors before the release date of the film. In Japan, the film was later dubbed into Japanese and will be released on 29 December.  Despite the various measures taken, pirated versions of Baahubali 2 were available on the Internet within hours of the film's release. The film was dubbed in Russian and released in Russia and neighboring territories on 11 January 2018. It was censored for release in China in March 2018 and was released in Chinese on 4 May 2018.

Worldwide distribution on the Qube Wire platform

Marketing 

A 25-member marketing team at Arka was responsible for marketing Baahubali 2. On 30 September 2016, the logo of Baahubali 2 was revealed along with the tagline 'Why Kattappa Killed Baahubali'. On 22 October 2016, the first look poster of the film was released on the birthday of Prabhas. The poster, according to CNN-News18, features Prabhas flexing his muscles, holding a two edged sword and a chain in either of his hands, while The Hindu notices the presence of Amarendra Baahubali in the background. Rana Daggubati's first look as Bhallaladeva was further revealed on his birthday. According to The Indian Express, the poster features Rana Daggubati as Bhallaladeva with "a vicious glare, salt-and-pepper hair with a man bun, cladding a bullish armour and holding a humongous retractable mace." A virtual reality teaser was also released. On 26 January 2017, the first look poster of Anushka Shetty as Devasena was released. The trailer of the film was released on 17 March 2017.

Baahubali 2 was also promoted extensively on social media platforms including Facebook, Twitter and Instagram. Upon being asked about the film's marketing, Yarlagadda said, "The idea was to engage with different demographics, who are interested in different things. If you are into technology, then Baahubali VR becomes a driving factor for you to watch the film; if you are into graphic novels and gaming, we had plans to address those needs too." A graphic novel titled Baahubali  The Battle of the Bold was released digitally on 28 February 2017.  Rajamouli approached Anand Neelakantan to write a series subtitled Before the Beginning. The first novel in the series, titled The Rise of Sivagami, was released on 7 March 2017. A clothing line based on the film was revealed on 7 April at a fashion show, with the cast including Rana Daggubati and Tamanaah attending it. The makers further collaborated with Moonfrog Labs to create an online multiplayer game titled Baahubali  The Game, which published on 28 April 2017. In a review for the game, Srivathsan Nadadhur of The Hindu writes, "while it seems a little familiar, it is good fun as long as it lasts." The cast arrived in Dubai to inaugurate the film's release in a promotional event on 25 April 2017.

Rights and sales 
It was rumoured that Great India Films had brought the US distribution rights of Baahubali 2. However, these rumours were refuted by Great India Films. Cinestaan AA Distributors distributed the Hindi version in US, Britain, Australia and New Zealand. Srinivasan of Says S Pictures distributed the film in North Arcot and South Arcot in Tamil Nadu. The Hindi version was distributed in North India by Anil Thadani's AA Films and presented by Karan Johar's Dharma Productions. In Malaysia, the film was distributed by MSK Film Production and Antenna Entertainments. Amjad Rasheed distributed the film in Pakistan. Telugu, Tamil and Malayalam broadcasting rights were brought by Star India for 280 million. Sony acquired the satellite rights for the Hindi version for 500 million.
Baahubali 2 set a record collection of 5 billion before the release of the film through satellite and theatrical rights. The Telugu version of the film was insured against financial loss by Future Generali for 2 billion. Netflix brought the rights of Baahubali 2 for 255 million.

About one million tickets were sold within 24 hours of the advance booking. Tickets were sold out until 2 May. Later, tickets for the first week were sold out. The sale rate was the highest ever in India, beating the record held by Dangal. Booking sites of multiplex players crashed down due to high traffic. In UAE, the film sold more than hundred thousand tickets before release, the highest ever for an Indian film, breaking the record held by Fast and Furious bookings. BookMyShow and PayTM offered discounts on Baahubali 2 tickets. At the end of its theatrical run in India Baahubali 2 had sold an estimated 100million tickets, the highest estimated footfall for any film in India in decades; Box Office India notes that the estimated footfalls of Mother India (1957), Mughal-e-Azam (1960) and Sholay (1975) could be more than that of Baahubali 2.

Complications 
The morning shows of Baahubali 2 in several cinema theatres across Tamil Nadu were halted. The reason being was that the rights to distribute the film Baahubali 2 in Tamil, which was initially sold by Arka Media Works to K Productions, was resold by the latter to Sri Green Productions. Sri Green Productions was unable to pay the full amount leading to problems in the film's distribution as Sri Green had already made deals with local distributors. Arka Media Works had to intervene to resolve the financial issues and had to bear the full cost for the smooth release of the film. Scenes from Baahubali 2 were released online 2 days before the film's release. Activists in Karnataka threatened to stall the film's release in their state due to a statement made by Sathyaraj concerning the Cauvery river, unless the actor apologized. Sathyaraj later apologized for hurting the sentiments of the activists. The entertainment tax to be paid on each ticket was not paid, due to the sale of unaccounted tickets.

Box office 
Baahubali 2 grossed 2.17 billion on its opening day and 5.10 billion in its opening weekend worldwide. It also became the highest grossing Indian film worldwide with a gross of 7.92 billion in six days. It became the first Indian film to enter the 1000 Crore Club, grossing over 10 billion in all languages in India. and further grossed over 12.5 billion in all languages by the end of two weeks.

India 
Baahubali 2 grossed 1.52 billion in India on the first day of its release. In 3 days, the film grossed 3.82 billion, setting the record for the highest opening weekend gross in India. It became the highest-grossing film in India grossing 5.58 billion in 5 days.  Baahubali 2: The Conclusion crossed 10 billion nett. mark in India in all languages in 30 days. The film grossed 3.279 billion in Andhra Pradesh and Telangana, 1.526 billion in Tamil Nadu, 1.29 billion in Karnataka  and 750 million in Kerala. In the rest of India Baahubali 2 grossed about 7.324 billion taking the film's total gross in India to 14.169 billion which is the highest for a film in India. Baahubali 2: The Conclusion netted 11.156 billion in India and its distributor share was 6.6135 billion. The Hindi dubbed version of the film grossed more than ₹511 crore which is the highest collection for any film in Hindi language only.

International 
Baahubali 2 grossed 650 million overseas on the first day of its release, the highest opening for an Indian film surpassing Kabali. In 3 days, the film collected 1.28 billion from the overseas market with 670.45 million coming from the US alone, setting the humongous record for 3 day collection. Baahubali 2 grossed 79.35million, third on the global box office list, during the opening weekend, 10.43 million in the United States alone, the highest-ever opening for an Indian film in the US. On 3 May 2017, Baahubali 2 became the highest grossing Indian film at the US box office with US$12.5 million, surpassing Dangals gross of US$12.3 million.As of 14 May 2017, the film had grossed US$20,186,659 in the United States.

It became the first Indian film to exceed $11.1 million in takings in Middle-East-GCC-Gulf, surpassing Bajrangi Bhaijaan. 

Baahubali 2 grossed  in its opening weekend.

In Japan, the film grossed  by April 2018, becoming the third highest-grossing Indian film there, after Rajnikanth's Tamil film Muthu (1995) and Aamir Khan's Bollywood film 3 Idiots (2009). Baahubali 2 later grossed  by May 2018, and has grossed  .Final grossed was about ¥365 million.

Reception

Critical response

India 
The film received universal acclaim and from both the critics and audience. Rachit Gupta from Filmfare gave the film a rating of 4.5/5, stating, "SS Rajamouli's much-awaited sequel is the kind of movie Indian cinema should make regularly. It's the kind of sweeping magnum opus that Indian mythos and culture deserve. It's the biggest film we have ever made and barring a few minor glitches in CGI, this film is possibly the greatest spectacle you'll see on a big screen, in your life." Sangeetha Devi Dundoo from The Hindu stated, "For the most part, The Conclusion doesn't let us take our eyes off the screen. It's designed to be a cinematic celebration, one that deserves to be watched on the largest screen possible". Anupama Subramanian of the Deccan Chronicle gave the film a 3.5/5, praising the acting of the stars while complaining about "the lack of a solid plot' and called the ending "predictable."

Vishnuprasad Pillai of Asianet News gave a negative review, writing that the film "offers nothing new... The writing from KV Vijayendra Prasad fails inspire or to do justice to an epic of such scale," adding that "the dialogues at times are downright corny and plot developments cringe-worthy." Dipanjan Sinha of Hindustan Times gave the film a rating of 3/5 stars, praising the film's cinematography and special effects, but found faults with some of the female characters. Sinha stated, "Devasena ... starts off as an ace warrior only to be tamed into someone who has to be protected." Shubhra Gupta of Indian Express rated the film 2/5 stars, noting problems with pacing and sound, writing, "The background music is relentless, and the pitch at which the declamatory dialogues are delivered is deafening: there were times I felt like closing my ears." Taran Adarsh of Bollywood Hungama rates the film 4.5 out of 5 and praises the performance of the cast, writing, "It's a feast for moviegoers and has the trappings to make all generations its fan."

Meena Iyer from The Times of India rated it 4/5, writing: "Just savor it. It is a visual extravaganza that India must feast on ... Prabhas is terrific as father and son. Of course, it is CGI and VFX that grab you in your seat." Hemanth Kumar from Firstpost called it "Rajamouli's epic drama" and rated it 4/5.
Sukanya Verma from Rediff rated the film 3.5/5, writing the film, "continues its tradition of grandiloquence and magnitude... high drama, more than spectacle, is what lends its riveting tale of revenge and glory all its wallop and wizardry." She also praised the film's cast and director stating, "Equipped with a cast that's not only in tune with Rajamouli's vision but knows exactly where to hold back and when to give their all adds to Baahubali's might."

International 
It was further featured in Rotten Tomatoes' list of Best Off the Radar Films of 2017, in which Tim Ryan writes, "Baahubali 2: The Conclusion plays like a shotgun wedding between Ben Hur and Kung Fu Hustle, seasoned with bits of Shakespeare, Kurosawa, and Buster Keaton," opining, "it's a blockbuster that's both gigantic and lighter than air." Mike McCahill of The Guardian gave a 4/5 rating and called it "a jaw-dropping blockbuster that combines nimble action with genuine heart". He also stated, "This production's triumph is the room it's granted Rajamouli to head into the fields and dream up endlessly expressive ways to frame bodies in motion. Of the many sequences here primed to cut through jadedness, perhaps the most wondrous is that which finds Baahu guiding Deva mid-battle to shoot three arrows simultaneously – a set piece that speaks both to a love of action, and love in action. The budget's big, the muscle considerable, but they're nothing compared with Baahubalis heart."

Manjusha Radhakrishnan of Gulf News rates the film 3.5 out of 5 and writes, "This is a sweeping visual spectacle filled with epic battle scenes, clashes between warring troops from Indian mythology and elephants on a rampage," but further added, "There were times in the second half where you felt the computer-generated graphics took over the story. But all this is new and exotic for Indian cinema." Shilpa Jamkhandikar of Reuters writes, "It may not up the ante from the last film, but it doesn't let up on the pace either. For an Indian film, that is no mean feat." J Hurtado of ScreenAnarchy writes, "It's a bit daunting because it does begin in media res immediately following the complex actions of the first film, but astute viewers will put together the pieces soon enough." Kabita Maharana of International Business Times gave a rating of 4 out of 5 and writes, "From the very first scene, the film is a visual extravaganza. Every frame is meticulously captured by SS Rajamouli and his team. This is the first Indian film hailed for excelling in visual effects."

Simon Abrams of RogerEbert.com gave the film a 4/4 rating and writes the film "is everything I want but rarely get from superhero and big-budget fantasy movie" adding "the fight scenes... are so creative that they make even the most frequently abused creative shortcuts seem novel, everything from computer-generated imagery (CGI) to speed-ramping... You care what happens to the cast as they, aided by wires, hurl volleys of arrows at disposable minions and CGI animals." Anita Iyer from Khaleej Times rates the film 3.5 out of 5 and writes, "What stands out in the film is the powerful star cast. Enough has been said already about the acting prowess of Prabhas but he has an equally supportive cast to hold the film. Ramya Krishna as Sivagami, is known for her impressive acting talent and proves her mettle here. Another veteran, Sathyaraj as Katappa excels and you develop a camaraderie with him. Rana Daggubati is aptly spiteful in his portrayal of the villain... Nassar, as his father, is busy spewing venom but his role could have been meatier."

Accolades 

Baahubali 2 won the Telstra People's Choice Award at the Indian Film Festival of Melbourne, sharing the prize with Dangal. Tamannaah Bhatia and K.V. Vijayendra Prasad won the Global Indian Impact Icon Award for Baahubali 2 at NRI of the Year Awards. The CNN-IBN Indian of the Year Awards (2017) for Outstanding Achievement in Entertainment was given to Team Baahubali. Prabhas, Shetty, Keeravani, Rajamouli were nominated for Favorite Hero Of The Year, Favorite Heroine of the Year, Favorite Music Director and Favourite Director respectively, while Saahore Baahubali and the film were nominated for Favourite Song and Favourite Film at the Zee Telugu Golden Awards. Baahubali 2 won the Saturn Award for Best International Film at the 44th Saturn Awards. At the 65th National Film Awards, it won in three categories: Best Stunt Choreography, Best Special Effects and Best Popular Film Providing Wholesome Entertainment. Baahubali 2 also received nominations in every category (except Best Male Playback Singer – Telugu) at the 65th Filmfare Awards South. It also won in all categories, except for Best Actor, Best Actress and Best Playback Singer – Female. It got two nominations at the 10th Mirchi Music Awards.

Impact 

Duology of Baahubali franchise started a new film movement, Pan-Indian film, that is, rather than remaking the same film in various languages, they are dubbing the same film in various languages. Srivatsan S of The Hindu wrote that Telugu cinema has excelled in marketing Pan-Indian films. It primarily employed two strategies – promoting the film outside their home territory and collaborating with other regional stars for more visibility.

The film received appreciation from members of the Indian film industry.
Rajinikanth praised Baahubali 2, calling Rajamouli "god's own child" and equating the film to "Indian cinema's pride." Chiranjeevi praised the film and stated that Rajamouli "deserved all accolades" for making the film. Mahesh Bhatt called it "a game changer" that "redefines everything you thought you knew and understood about Indian movies." His daughter Alia Bhatt called the film a "rock buster." Mahesh Babu stated the film "exceed expectations," while Shekhar Kapur congratulated Rajamouli. Shah Rukh Khan, despite not watching the film, praised it and said, "But if you want to create that big cinema and that big dream to sell to a big number of people, you have to have guts to take that storytelling on and say it in the biggest, nicest, boldest way possible. Baahubali stands for that."

Prasad had confirmed that a third cinematic part will not occur in the franchise. However, Yarlagadda said, "We have an animated series that is premiering on Amazon. Then we have graphic and regular novels that will tell us the backstory of the Mahishmati kingdom. We want to make the story of Sivagami – how she became a power centre into a TV series in a grand way. There is also a virtual reality experience. We have many more plans where fans can engage in the world of Bahubali." This was also confirmed by Prabhas, who said, "We are done with the story of Baahubali, there cannot be a third part. But the world and the legacy of Baahubali will live on through a comic series and a TV series."

Prabhas, Bhatia and Shetty were a part of IMDb's Top Ten Stars of Indian Cinema list of 2017. Baahubali 2 was the most talked about film in India on Twitter in 2017. On Google, the film was the most searched topic and most searched film in India for the year 2017. Worldwide, it was the 7th most searched film in 2017. The song "Saahore Baahubali" topped the list of most searched for songs in India. Owing to the success of the film, the set of the film at the Ramoji Film City was opened for tourism. According to Firstpost, the only phenomenon comparable to the "Baahubali mania" was Rajinikanth fandom. The Wikipedia article on Baahubali 2 became the most read film article on the encyclopedia in 2017. The Baahubali 2 trailer was the second most viewed in the year of 2017 on YouTube with more than 29 million views behind the Avengers: Infinity War trailer.

Notes

References

External links 
 
 
 Baahubali 2: The Conclusion at Bollywood Hungama

Baahubali (franchise)
Indian sequel films
2017 action drama films
Indian action drama films
Indian epic films
Indian historical action films
Indian films about revenge
Fiction about regicide
Fratricide in fiction
Films shot in Kannur
Films shot at Ramoji Film City
2010s Telugu-language films
2010s Tamil-language films
Films set in ancient India
Films scored by M. M. Keeravani
Films directed by S. S. Rajamouli
Telstra People's Choice Award winners
IMAX films
Best Popular Film Providing Wholesome Entertainment National Film Award winners
Films that won the Best Special Effects National Film Award
Indian multilingual films
2017 masala films
2017 multilingual films